Samian may refer to:
 Something or someone from the Greek island of Samos
 Samian Sibyl
 Pythagoras of Samos, or Pythagoras the Samian
 Something or someone from another of the locations known as Samos
 Samian ware, a term used by archaeologists for Roman terra sigillata pottery produced in Gaul
 Samian, a band that Green Day drummer Tré Cool formerly played in
 Samian (rapper), a Canadian hip hop musician
 Samian, Iran, a village in Ardabil Province

See also
 Samiam, a punk rock band